Ally Financial is a bank holding company organized in Delaware and headquartered at Ally Detroit Center in Detroit, Michigan. The company provides financial services including car finance, online banking via a direct bank, corporate lending, vehicle insurance, mortgage loans, and an electronic trading platform to trade financial assets.

Ally is one of the largest car finance companies in the U.S., providing car financing and leasing for 4.5 million customers and originating 1.4 million car loans annually. It is on the list of largest banks in the United States by assets and has 2.0 million depositors. Its electronic trading platform has approximately 350,000 funded accounts. The company has sold more than 5 million vehicles, including 336,000 vehicles sold in 2022 via its SmartAuction online marketplace for auto auctions, launched in 2000.

The company was known as GMAC, an acronym for General Motors Acceptance Corporation, until 2010.

History
The company was founded in 1919 by General Motors (GM) as the General Motors Acceptance Corporation (GMAC) to provide financing to automotive customers. In 1939, the company founded Motors Insurance Corporation and entered the vehicle insurance market.

In 1985, while GM was under the leadership of Roger Smith, who sought to diversify the company, GMAC formed GMAC Mortgage and acquired Colonial Mortgage as well as the servicing arm of Norwest Mortgage, which included an $11 billion mortgage portfolio.

In 1991, the company was forced to write-off $275 million in bad debt as part of a $436 million loss suffered from fraud committed by John McNamara, who ran a Ponzi scheme.

In 1998, the company formed GMAC Real Estate. In 1999, GMAC Mortgage acquired Ditech. In 2000, the company formed GMAC Bank, a direct bank. In 2005, the company formed GMAC ResCap as a holding company for its mortgage operations.

In 2006, General Motors sold a 51% interest in GMAC to Cerberus Capital Management, a private equity firm. Also that year, GMAC sold a controlling interest of GMAC Commercial Holdings (its real estate division renamed Capmark) to Goldman Sachs, Kohlberg Kravis Roberts, and Five Mile Capital Partners. GMAC Real Estate was sold to Brookfield Asset Management. In 2009, Capmark filed for bankruptcy and its North American loan origination and servicing business was acquired by Berkadia, a joint venture of Leucadia National and Berkshire Hathaway.

On December 24, 2008, the Federal Reserve accepted the company's application to become a bank holding company. In January 2009, the company closed Nuvell Financial Services, its subprime lending division.

As a result of losses in GMAC ResCap, the United States Department of the Treasury invested $17.2 billion in the company in 2008–2009. The Treasury sold its last stake in the company in 2014, recovering $19.6 billion from its $17.2 billion investment.

At the time, the bank had 265 Charlotte employees in three business units.

In May 2009, GMAC Bank was rebranded as Ally Bank. In May 2010, GMAC re-branded itself as Ally Financial. In September 2010, the company sold its resort finance business to Centerbridge Partners. In 2012, the company sold its Canadian banking operations to Royal Bank of Canada for $3.8 billion. In April 2014, it became a public company via an initial public offering. In 2015, it moved its headquarters to One Detroit Center, which was subsequently renamed Ally Detroit Center. In June 2016, the company acquired TradeKing, a stockbrokerage, for $275 million, which was re-branded as Ally Invest.

In May 2016, Ally Bank re-entered the mortgage business with the launch of its direct-to-consumer offering called Ally Home. In April 2019, Ally Home partnered with Better.com to launch a digital mortgage platform.

In October 2019. Ally acquired Health Credit Services (HCS), a technology-focused patient financing company based in Charlotte, North Carolina.

On May 3, 2021, Ally began occupying 725,000 square feet at Ally Charlotte Center. 

In December 2021, Ally acquired Fair Square Financial, a credit card company, for $750 million and rebranded it as Ally Credit Card.

Sponsorships
The company sponsors the Miami International Auto Show, the Time Dealer of the Year award, and The Ally Challenge.

In 2019, Ally became the primary sponsor for seven-time NASCAR Cup Series champion Jimmie Johnson at Hendrick Motorsports, a sponsorship that runs through 2023. As GMAC, the company previously had primary sponsorships with Hendrick Motorsports from 1998 through 2007 with drivers Jack Sprague, Ricky Hendrick, Brian Vickers and Casey Mears, including Vickers' 2003 NASCAR Busch Series championship victory. Alex Bowman took over the No. 48 Ally Chevrolet in 2021 after Johnson transitioned from NASCAR to the IndyCar Series; before the season began, Ally also acquired the naming rights to the Cup Series' race at Nashville Superspeedway to name it the Ally 400.

Ally is also a sponsor of the National Women's Soccer League and of a team in Major League Soccer, Charlotte FC.

In 2021, Ally continued to sponsor Jimmie Johnson in WeatherTech SportsCar Championship with his No.48 Cadillac DPi-V.R entry in IMSA Michelin Endurance Cup rounds alongside Kamui Kobayashi and Simon Pagenaud. Mike Rockenfeller joined the team for 2021 24 Hours of Daytona.

In 2022, DC Comics, Milestone Media, and Warner Bros. Discovery partnered with Ally and NASCAR to debut a sponsorship and new paint scheme, based on the DC superhero character Static, for Alex Bowman's No. 48 Chevrolet Camaro ZL1 1LE for the Hendrick Motorsports team, in support of DC's The Milestone Initiative program.

In February 2023, Ally became a league-wide sponsor for NASCAR, including becoming the official consumer bank of NASCAR and NASCAR-owned tracks.

Legal issues

2013 discrimination settlement

In December 2013, the Consumer Financial Protection Bureau (CFPB) and United States Department of Justice ordered the company to pay $80 million in consumer monetary damages and $18 million in civil penalties after determining that 235,000 minority borrowers paid higher interest rates for auto loans originated between April 2011 and December 2013 because of the company's discriminatory pricing system. The higher rates resulted from the company's specific policy of allowing dealers to charge, at their discretion, a "dealer markup" above Ally's established "buy rate" and then compensating dealers based on the markup. Ally provided an incentive for dealers to charge higher rates, in violation of the Equal Credit Opportunity Act.

References

External links

 

 
1919 establishments in Michigan
American companies established in 1919
Banks established in 1919
Companies based in Detroit
Banks based in Michigan
Companies listed on the New York Stock Exchange
Financial services companies of the United States
Mortgage lenders of the United States
Online banks
2014 initial public offerings
Financial services companies established in 1919
Online brokerages